China Clipper (NC14716) was the first of three Martin M-130 four-engine flying boats built for Pan American Airways and was used to inaugurate the first commercial transpacific airmail service from San Francisco to Manila on November 22, 1935. Built at a cost of $417,000 by the Glenn L. Martin Company in Baltimore, Maryland, it was delivered to Pan Am on October 9, 1935. It was one of the largest airplanes of its time.

On November 22, 1935, it took off from Alameda, California in an attempt to deliver the first airmail cargo across the Pacific Ocean. Although its inaugural flight plan called for the China Clipper to fly over the San Francisco–Oakland Bay Bridge (still under construction at the time), upon take-off the pilot realized the plane would not clear the structure, and was forced to fly narrowly under instead. On November 29, the airplane reached its destination, Manila, after traveling via Honolulu, Midway Island, Wake Island, and Sumay, Guam, and delivered over 110,000 pieces of mail. The crew for this flight included Edwin C. Musick as pilot and Fred Noonan as navigator.
The inauguration of ocean airmail service and commercial air flight across the Pacific was a significant event for both California and the world. Its departure point is California Historical Landmark #968 and can be found in Naval Air Station Alameda.

Aircraft

Although each clipper that joined the Pan American fleet to serve on their Trans-Pacific routes was given an individual name, collectively they were known as the China Clippers.

Although a Sikorsky S-42 flying boat was used on the initial proving flights, it had insufficient range to carry passengers along the route. Consequently, the passenger service was started with Martin M-130 flying boats:

China Clipper (NC-14716) October 1935 
Philippine Clipper (NC-14715) November 1935
Hawaii Clipper (NC-14714) March 1936

Later the larger Boeing 314 Clipper flying boats were assigned to the route:

Honolulu Clipper (NC-18601) January 1939
California Clipper (NC-18602) January 1939
Pacific Clipper (NC-18609(A)) May 1941

Additional clippers were assigned to the Trans-Atlantic and South American routes operated by Pan-American.

Considerable effort was put into preparing for the inauguration of the first Trans-Pacific route. The relatively short range of the aircraft meant that hotel, catering, docking, repair, road and radio facilities had to be put in place at the intermediate stops along the route, particularly on the virtually uninhabited islands of Wake and Midway. Nearly a half a million miles were flown along the route before any paying passengers were carried.

The clippers were, for all practical purposes, luxury flying hotels, with sleeping accommodation, dining rooms and leisure facilities in addition to the usual aircraft seating. On early flights, the crew outnumbered the passengers. As a result, the price of a return air ticket say San Francisco to Honolulu was $1700. In comparison, a brand-new Plymouth automobile cost about $600 in the late 1930s.

World War II
The China Clipper was painted olive drab with a large American flag painted below the cockpit. The China Clipper was referred to as "Sweet Sixteen" by Pan American personnel. The "Sixteen" is a reference to the aircraft's registration number NC14716.

Crash

The China Clipper remained in Pan Am service until January 8, 1945, when it was destroyed in a crash in Port of Spain, Trinidad and Tobago. Flight 161 had started at Miami bound for Leopoldville in the Belgian Congo, making its first stop to refuel at Puerto Rico before flying on to Port-of-Spain. After one missed approach, on the second approach to land it came down too low and hit the water at a high speed and nose-down a mile-and-a-quarter short of its intended landing area. The impact broke the hull in two which quickly flooded and sank. Twenty-three passengers and crew were killed; there were seven survivors including Captain C.A. Goyette, Pilot-in-Command for the flight, and Captain L.W. Cramer, First Officer, who was flying the plane from the left seat when it crashed.

On April 24, 1946, the Civil Aeronautics Board released its accident investigation report with the following findings "upon the basis of all available evidence":
 The carrier, aircraft and pilots had proper certificates.
 Captain Cramer, having very limited flight time in the aircraft, was at the controls with Captain Goyette acting in a supervisory capacity.
 Conditions of weather and water surface within the vicinity of Port-of-Spain were satisfactory for a safe approach and landing.
 The plane first contacted the water at a higher-than-normal landing speed, and in a nose-low attitude.
 The crash occurred at a point one-and-a-quarter miles short of the intended landing area.
 Forces created by the speeds of the plane on its contact with the water and the excessive nose-down-attitude caused failure of the hull bottom and its structure resulting in rapid submersion of the aircraft.
 Landing of the aircraft in the attitude indicated, under the then-existing conditions of water surface and weather, was due to Cramer's having misjudged his true altitude and his failure to correct his attitude for a normal landing. 
 At the time of the accident, Captain Cramer was not wearing eyeglasses as required by his pilot certificate.
 Captain Goyette, in command of the aircraft and with full knowledge of Cramer's limited experience in the Martin M-130, failed to exercise sufficient supervision of the landing.

Probable cause: On the basis of the above findings, the board determined that the probable cause of this accident was: (1) First Officer Cramer's failure to realize his proximity to the water and to correct his attitude for a normal landing and, (2) the lack of adequate supervision by the captain during the landing resulting in the inadvertent flight into the water in excess of normal landing speed and in a nose-down attitude.

Legacy

Both the United States and Philippine Islands issued stamps for air mail carried on the first flights in each direction of PAA's Transpacific China Clipper service between San Francisco and Manila (November 22 – December 6, 1935)

First National Pictures released the movie China Clipper in 1936. It told a thinly disguised bio of the life of Juan Trippe during the founding of PanAm. The film made use of much documentary footage of the actual airplane, as well as aerial photography created specifically for the production. It was also one of Humphrey Bogart's early roles.

Footage of the China Clipper, and/or possibly other M-130s loading and taking off from Alameda, is included in the 1937 comedy film Fly-Away Baby and the 1939 adventure film Secret Service of the Air.

The China Clipper is also a significant setting in the contemporaneous radio serial Speed Gibson of the International Secret Police (1937–1939).
More recently, it was referenced in the Monkees song "Zilch" from their 1967 album Headquarters.  Davy Jones can be heard repeating "China Clipper calling Alameda" in that track.

The flying boats and Treasure Island, San Francisco were featured by Huell Howser in California's Gold Episode 906.

See also
 Hawaii Clipper disappeared in 1938
 Pan Am Flight 1104, crash of Philippine Clipper in 1943

References
Notes

Bibliography

Cohen, Stan Wings to the Orient, Pan-Am Clipper Planes 1935–1945 Pictorial Histories.
"Transpacific" Time, December 2, 1935
Accident description at Air Safety Network

External links

 China Clipper – The Martin 130
 Pan American Airways Clippers 1931–1936
 A visit to the former China Clipper base on Treasure Island, San Francisco
 "China Clipper is Giant of Pacific Air Fleet" Popular Mechanics, January 1936
 Final accident report of the Trinidad crash from the Civil Aeronautics Board (PDF)

Pan Am
Pan Am accidents and incidents
Individual aircraft
Martin aircraft
Alameda, California
Aviation accidents and incidents in Trinidad and Tobago
Aviation accidents and incidents in 1945
Airliner accidents and incidents involving controlled flight into terrain
1945 in Trinidad and Tobago
January 1945 events in North America

ja:マーチン M130